Chase Tower (formerly known as Valley Center and Bank One Center) is a 40-story skyscraper at 201 North Central Avenue in Phoenix, Arizona. Opened in 1972, the building was designed by architects Welton Becket and Fred M. Guirey. The skyscraper is located in Central Avenue Corridor, an economic and residential region of Downtown Phoenix.

Chase Tower was initially constructed for Valley National Bank. In 1973, Bank One merged with Valley National Bank, and in 2005, Chase merged with Bank One. The building was renamed in December 2005.

At , Chase Tower is the tallest building in Arizona.

Site
Chase Tower is on 201 North Central Avenue, in the Central Avenue Corridor region of Downtown Phoenix.

Chase Tower is 40 stories tall, but the highest occupiable floor is the 38th. At one time there was a public observation area on the 39th floor in the Chase Tower, but it was closed during redevelopment and construction on the upper floors.

The tower takes up an entire city block. The footprint is similar to a 3 leaf clover and its stem. The stem is the narrow elevator core on the southern facade. It has a rough, concrete texture and is the tallest portion of the tower. The remaining exterior is a glass panel curtain wall. The west leaf, or wing, stands at 34 floors, followed by the north wing at 38 floors, and the east wing at 36 floors. Unlike many traditional skyscrapers with zero-setback retail/lobby space on the ground floor, access to the tower is through an underground restaurant/retail concourse set a comparatively large distance away from the bordering streets.

History

 The building was designed by the prominent Los Angeles architectural firm Welton Becket and Associates (now Ellerbe Becket), with local associate architects Guirey, Srnka, Arnold & Sprinkle. It was built by the Henry C. Beck Company (now The Beck Group). Upon completion, the tower marked the beginning of a renewed investment in downtown Phoenix that would last for almost twenty years until the savings and loan crisis brought about the 1989 real estate crash. Located at 201 North Central Avenue, the tower was renovated in 2003 to accommodate 800 additional Bank One employees.

In March 2007, CRZ Phoenix, LLC, an affiliate of Crystal River Capital, acquired the property for $166.9 million, the highest price paid for an office building in Phoenix. The owners took out a $198.5 million loan on the property in 2007, on which it subsequently defaulted.

In May 2018, a partnership managed by Wentworth Property Company acquired the building out of foreclosure for $79 million, less than half of its 2007 sale price. Less than six months later, Vincent Viola purchased the building for $107.5 million.

As of July 2021, Chase is in the process of vacating the building as most employees have been transferred to Chase's new corporate campus in (east suburban) Tempe. The last employees are expected to transition to the new location by September 30, 2021. At that point, the building will stand empty. No future plans for the tower have been announced. As of November 1, 2021, the Chase sign atop the building has been removed.

The building was featured in the History Channel series, Life After People.

On February 7, 2023, a pro-life activist named Maison DesChamps, calling himself "Pro-life Spiderman", scaled the tower with no safety gear to raise awareness for an anti-abortion charity. He successfully reached the roof of the building, and was taken into custody by officers who were waiting at the top, who charged him with trespassing and criminal nuisance.

See also
List of tallest buildings in Phoenix
List of tallest buildings in Arizona

References

External links

http://www.chase.com
http://www.coppersquare.com
Phoenix Architecture 1895 thru 2010: Video celebrating Phoenix Architecture

Office buildings completed in 1972
JPMorgan Chase buildings
Skyscraper office buildings in Phoenix, Arizona
Welton Becket buildings
Modernist architecture in Arizona
1972 establishments in Arizona